Susanna Margarete of Anhalt-Dessau (Dessau, 23 August 1610 – Babenhausen, 13 October 1663), was by birth a member of the House of Ascania and princess of Anhalt-Dessau. After her marriage she became Countess of Hanau-Lichtenberg.

She was the eighth daughter of John George I, Prince of Anhalt-Dessau, but fifth-born daughter of his second wife Dorothea, daughter of John Casimir of Simmern.

Life
In 1641, at the age of thirty-one, Susanna Margarete was betrothed to John Ernest, Count of Hanau-Münzenberg-Schwarzenfels, the last male heir of the line of Hanau-Münzenberg; however, he died of smallpox shortly before the wedding was to take place in 1642.

In Buchsweiler on 16 February 1651, Susanna Margarete married John Philip of Hanau-Lichtenberg, younger brother of the ruling Count Frederick Casimir, husband of her older sister Sibylle Christine of Anhalt-Dessau.

Probably on account of the substantial age difference between the spouses (Susanna Margarete was sixteen years older than John Philip), the marriage was childless.

References

House of Ascania
House of Hanau
1610 births
1663 deaths
People from Dessau-Roßlau
Daughters of monarchs